Nneka Renacole Rice  (born January 27, 1977) known professionally as Nacole Rice is an American R&B/Soul singer.

Early life
Nneka Renacole Rice was born on January 27, 1977, in Gallatin, Tennessee. Raised in a musical family, she would spend most of her early years singing in various church choirs at Key-Stewart United Methodist Church. As a teen, Nacole mastered the art of performing under the direction of her vocal coach Vera Warrick. Warrick would later develop an all-female quartet Shadz of U, which featured childhood friends Chandra Boone, Selina Robb, Kimberley Locke and a young Nacole. The group went on to becoming local sensations throughout the Nashville area. Shadz of U is featured on Kimberley Locke's "Everyday Angels" off her second album Based on a True Story in 2007.

"First Impression" [mix tape] and Her Story [debut album]

On April 10, 2012, Nacole Rice released her first introduction track "For the Road" off her upcoming debut album Her Story, which was scheduled for a Late 2013 release but was never released due to conflicts with the label.

Discography

Mixtapes

First Impression (2013)

Singles
For The Road (produced by JRed) (2012)

References

 

Living people
Singers from Tennessee
1985 births
People from Gallatin, Tennessee
American soul singers
20th-century African-American women singers
21st-century American singers
21st-century American women singers
21st-century African-American women singers